M. A. Wazed Miah (6 February 19429 May 2009) was a Bangladeshi physicist and the writer of a number of texts in physics and some political history books, a former Chairman of the Bangladesh Atomic Energy Commission and husband of Prime Minister Sheikh Hasina.

Early life
Wazed Miah was born on 16 February 1942 in the village of Fatehpur (Miah Bari) at Pirganj, Rangpur District to Abdul Quader Miah and Moyzunnessa (Maijun Nesa Bibi). He was the youngest among three sisters and four brothers. His uncle was Wazed Miah. He was then called 'Sudha Miah'. To get the best education, from Class Five he was sent to board at Rangpur Zila School, from where he ultimately passed Matriculation in First Division with Distinction.

He went to Rajshahi College. After passing the HSC exam, in 1958, he followed in the footsteps of his eldest sister's son, physicist Abdul Qayyum Sarker, and took admittance into the Department of Physics, Dhaka University. In 1961 he graduated with a Bachelor of Science in physics and in 1962 he finished his Master of Science. He completed the Diploma of Imperial College London Course in 1963–64. In 1967 he received his Doctor of Philosophy degree in physics from Durham University, England. His thesis was on the bootstrap hypothesis in theoretical particle physics, and he worked under Professor E. J. Squires.

Political career
From 1961 to 1962 he was the Vice-President of the Fazlul Huq Muslim Hall unit East Pakistan Muslim Chhatra League (currently known as Bangladesh Chhatra League) at University of Dhaka. He was arrested for movement against education commission and was imprisoned in 1962. He never played any active official role in the Awami League after his marriage to Sheikh Hasina.

Professional career

On 1 April 1963, Miah found employment with the Pakistan Atomic Energy Commission (PAEC), initially attached to the Atomic Energy Research Center (AERC) in Karachi. In 1969, Miah got an associateship at the International Centre for Theoretical Physics in Italy. In the same year, he returned home to Pakistan and continued with the AERC. In Karachi, Miah was the chief scientist at the Karachi Nuclear Power Plant but had his security clearance revoked, that led to termination of his contract and his migration to Bangladesh.

He was engaged in research work at the New Delhi-based laboratory of the Atomic Energy Commission of India during 1975–1982, during the period of exile of the remainder of the Mujib family after the bloody 15 August 1975 Bangladesh coup d'état. After his return to Bangladesh, he joined the Bangladesh Atomic Energy Commission, and retired as its chairman in 1999.

Personal life
Miah married Sheikh Hasina, eldest daughter of Bangabandhu Sheikh Mujibur Rahman on 17 November 1967. They have a son Sajeeb Wazed Joy and a daughter Saima Wazed Putul.

Death
Miah died on 9 May 2009. He had for long suffered from high blood pressure, heart disease, kidney failure, diabetes, and asthma. He had a bypass operation a few years earlier and an angioplasty in Singapore only a few months before his death. He was buried at a family graveyard in his native village at Pirganj, Rangpur.

Legacy
One of the main science buildings of University of Rajshahi, previously named as 4th Science Building, has recently been renamed after him as Dr. M Wazed Miah Academic Building. The Information and Communications Technology building of Shahjalal University of Science and Technology is named after him. An academic building is also constructed in his memory in Hajee Mohammad Danesh Science and Technology University.

Publications
Fundamentals Of Thermodynamics by MA Wazed Miah (University Press, Dhaka, 1988)
Fundamentals of Electromagnetics by MA Wazed Miah (Tata-McGraw-Hill, 1982)
Bangabandhu Sheikh Mujibke Ghire Kichhu Ghatana O Bangladesh (A Bangla Memoirs)
Bangladesher Rajniti O Sarkarer Chalchitra (A Bangla Memoirs)

References

1942 births
2009 deaths
Bangladeshi male writers
Bangladeshi physicists
Bangladeshi scientists
Bengali physicists
Bengali writers
Bengali-language writers
Fellows of Pakistan Academy of Sciences
University of Dhaka alumni
Sheikh Mujibur Rahman family
Sheikh Hasina
Alumni of Durham University Graduate Society